Ernesto Chet Trinidad Reyes (born 2 January 1996) is a Dominican footballer who plays as a defender for Cibao FC and the Dominican Republic national team.

Honours
 Cibao
CFU Club Championship (1): 2017

References

1996 births
Living people
People from Espaillat Province
Dominican Republic footballers
Association football defenders
Liga Dominicana de Fútbol players
Cibao FC players
Dominican Republic international footballers